NLU may refer to:

Felipe Ángeles International Airport, in Zumpango, State of Mexico, Mexico (IATA code NLU)
Insel Air Aruba, a former airline based in Aruba (ICAO code NLU)
Natural-language understanding
National Labor Union
National Law University
National-Louis University
University of Louisiana at Monroe (Northeast Louisiana University)